Alfred Henry Whitehouse (15 September 1856 – 7 April 1929) was a notable New Zealand motion picture exhibitor and producer. He was born in Birmingham, Warwickshire, England, in 1856.

Whitehouse produced the earliest New Zealand films being from the first of December 1898, the Opening of the Auckland Industrial and Mining Exhibition, and Boxing Day that year, Uhlan winning the Auckland Cup at Ellerslie Racecourse.

Whitehouse in 1895,  became the first person to exhibit motion pictures in New Zealand by using of Edison kinetoscopes. In 1898 Whitehouse imported a camera and employed photographer W. H. Bartlett to operate the camera. By mid 1900 Whitehouse had produced about 10 films.

Personal
Whitehouse was born in 1856 at Birmingham, Warwickshire, England, to Abel Whitehouse and Matilda (Craddock). He  married Eliza Davis at Auckland in 1878. Eliza died in 1888, leaving Alfred with five children. In 1897 he married Ada Baker. Ada died in 1910 and Whitehouse died in 1929. He was survived by two sons and a daughter.

References

1856 births
1929 deaths
1890s in New Zealand cinema
New Zealand film producers
English emigrants to New Zealand
People from Birmingham, West Midlands